is a Japanese professional footballer who plays as a forward for Yokohama FC, on loan from Sagan Tosu.

Playing career
Ishii was born in Fukuoka Prefecture on April 2, 2000. He joined J1 League club Sagan Tosu from youth team in 2018.

Career statistics

Last update: 27 February 2019

References

External links

2000 births
Living people
Association football people from Fukuoka Prefecture
Japanese footballers
J1 League players
Sagan Tosu players
J2 League players
Ehime FC players
Yokohama FC players
Association football forwards